San Martín or San Martin may refer to:

People

Saints 
Saint Martin (disambiguation)#People, name of various saints in Spanish

Political leaders 
Vicente San Martin (1839 -1901), Military, National hero of Mexico.
Basilio San Martin (1849 -1905), Military, Commander of the Fortress of San Juan De Ulua, Veracruz, Mexico
José de San Martín (1778–1850), national hero of Argentina, a 19th-century general and the main leader of the southern part of South America's struggle for independence from Spain
Manuel San Martin (1881-1965), Military, Mexican Revolution
Joaquín de San Martín (1770–1854), President of El Salvador
José María San Martín (1811–1857), President of El Salvador
Ramón Grau San Martín (1881–1969), doctor and twice President of Cuba
Alejandro Zorrilla de San Martín (1909–1987), Uruguayan political figure

Sportspeople 
Andrés San Martín (born 1978), Argentine footballer
Carlos Aníbal San Martín (born 1971), Argentine footballer
Horacio San Martín (born 1982), Argentine rugby footballer
Nelson San Martín (born 1980), Chilean footballer
Sylvia Iannuzzi-San Martín (born 1947), Argentine fencer

Others 
Fray Thomas de San Martín (1482–1555), founder of the National University of San Marcos in Lima, Peru
Juan Zorrilla de San Martín (1855–1931), Uruguayan epic poet

Places

Argentina
General San Martín Partido
San Martín, Buenos Aires
San Martín, Catamarca
San Martín Department, Corrientes
San Martín Department, Mendoza
San Martín, Mendoza
San Martín Department, San Juan
San Martín Department, Santiago del Estero
San Martín Department, Santa Fe
San Martín de los Andes
General San Martín Department, La Rioja
General San Martín Department, Salta
Libertador General San Martín Department, Misiones
Libertador General San Martín Department, Chaco
Libertador General San Martín Department, San Luis
Parque San Martín, Buenos Aires Province a city located in Merlo, Buenos Aires Province

Colombia
San Martín, Meta
San Martín, Cesar
San Martín Territory

El Salvador
San Martín, San Salvador

Malta
San Martin, San Pawl il-Baħar, St. Paul's Bay
Ġebel San Martin, Żejtun

Mexico
San Martín Chalchicuautla, San Luis Potosí
San Martín de Bolaños, Jalisco
San Martín de Hidalgo, Jalisco
San Martín de las Pirámides, State of Mexico
San Martín de los Cansecos, Oaxaca
San Martín Huamelulpam, Oaxaca
San Martín Itunyoso, Oaxaca
San Martín Lachilá, Oaxaca
San Martín Peras, Oaxaca
San Martín Tilcajete, Oaxaca
San Martín Toxpalan, Oaxaca	
San Martín Zacatepec, Oaxaca
San Martín Texmelucan, Puebla
San Martín Totoltepec, Puebla

Panama
San Martín, Panama

Peru
Department of San Martín, also known as San Martín Region
San Martín Province, in San Martín Region
San Martín District, in El Dorado Province, San Martín Region
San Martín de Porres District, In Lima Province, Lima Region

Spain
San Martín de Unx, Navarre
San Martín de Valdeiglesias, Madrid
San Martín del Río, a town in the province of Teruel, Aragón
San Martín del Tesorillo, Andalusia
San Martín (Proaza), a parish of Proaza, Asturias

United States
San Martin, California, a census-designated place and an unincorporated town

Antarctica
San Martín Base

Infrastructure
San Martin (1580), a Portuguese Navy galleon
San Martín (Mexibús), a BRT station in Ecatepec de Morelos, Mexico
San Martín (TransMilenio), a bus station in Bogotá, Colombia
Línea San Martín (Buenos Aires), an Argentine commuter rail line

Football
Club Atlético San Martín de Tucumán, 3rd tier football club from Argentina (2011)
Club Atlético San Martín de San Juan, 1st tier football club from Argentina (2011)
San Martín de Mendoza, 4th tier football club from Argentina (2011)
San Martín de Burzaco, 5th tier football club from Argentina (2011)
Universidad San Martín de Porres, 1st tier football club from Peru
San Martín de Porres de Pucallpa, a Peruvian football club, playing in the city of Pucallpa

Fiction
San Martín: El Cruce de los Andes, 2010 movie about José de San Martín

See also
General José de San Martín (disambiguation)
St. Martin (disambiguation)
Sânmartin (disambiguation)
Sint Maarten (disambiguation)

Surnames of Spanish origin